"My Own Step" is a song by American recording hip hop artist Roscoe Dash. The song was released as the fifth single off the Step Up 3D soundtrack. The song, produced by Don P of Trillville, features rapper Fabo and Grammy award-winning artist T-Pain.

Background
The song is featured in the movie Step Up 3D, and is the second on the soundtrack's track listing. Disney was originally looking for songs for the movie and found the original version of "My Own Step" which was sung by rapper YV and featured T-Pain, Fabo and Polow Da Don. When they found the song, they convinced Roscoe Dash to be on it, and kept R&B singer T-Pain and Fabo on the track.

Music video
The music video was released on July 13, 2010. It featured cameo appearances from the movie and artists including Lil Chuckee.

Charts

References

2010 singles
Roscoe Dash songs
T-Pain songs
Songs written by T-Pain
2010 songs
Songs written by Roscoe Dash
Songs written by K.E. on the Track